Csaba Preklet (born 25 January 1991) is a Hungarian football player who plays for Dorog.

Career
On 20 January 2023, Preklet signed with Dorog.

References

External links
 HLSZ
 Reggina: Prekletet Egerbe adják
 

1991 births
People from Kapuvár
Sportspeople from Győr-Moson-Sopron County
21st-century Hungarian people
Living people
Hungarian footballers
Hungary youth international footballers
Hungary under-21 international footballers
Association football defenders
Reggina 1914 players
Kecskeméti TE players
Egri FC players
Zalaegerszegi TE players
Vasas SC players
Ceglédi VSE footballers
Tiszakécske FC footballers
Pécsi MFC players
III. Kerületi TUE footballers
Dorogi FC footballers
Nemzeti Bajnokság I players
Nemzeti Bajnokság II players
Nemzeti Bajnokság III players
Hungarian expatriate footballers
Expatriate footballers in Italy
Hungarian expatriate sportspeople in Italy